Houting station can refer to the following stations:
Houting station (Fuzhou Metro), a station on Line 2 (Fuzhou Metro)
Houting station (Shenzhen Metro), a station on Line 11 (Shenzhen Metro)